Edward Laquan Williams (born November 1, 1964) is an American former professional first baseman and third baseman.

Career
Drafted by the New York Mets in the 1st round of the 1983 Major League Baseball draft out of Herbert Hoover High School in San Diego, California, Williams made his major league debut with the Cleveland Indians on April 18, 1986, and appear in his final game on May 27, 1998, for the San Diego Padres. He also played one season in the Nippon Professional Baseball (NPB) for the Fukuoka Daiei Hawks in 1991, and one season in South Korea's KBO League for the Hyundai Unicorns in 2000.

External links

Career statistics and player information from Korea Baseball Organization

1964 births
Living people
African-American baseball players
Albuquerque Dukes players
American expatriate baseball players in Australia
American expatriate baseball players in Canada
American expatriate baseball players in Japan
American expatriate baseball players in South Korea
Baseball players from Shreveport, Louisiana
Buffalo Bisons (minor league) players
Cedar Rapids Reds players
Chicago White Sox players
Cleveland Indians players
Colorado Springs Sky Sox players
Columbia Mets players
Detroit Tigers players
Fargo-Moorhead RedHawks players
Fukuoka Daiei Hawks players
Hyundai Unicorns players
KBO League infielders
Las Vegas Stars (baseball) players
Little Falls Mets players
Los Angeles Dodgers players
MacArthur Fellows
Major League Baseball first basemen
Major League Baseball third basemen
New Orleans Zephyrs players
Nippon Professional Baseball third basemen
Pittsburgh Pirates players
Richmond Braves players
Salt Lake Buzz players
San Diego Padres players
Sioux Falls Canaries players
Solano Steelheads players
Tampa Tarpons (1957–1987) players
Vancouver Canadians players
Waterbury Indians players
American expatriate baseball players in Mexico
Sultanes de Monterrey players
Algodoneros de Unión Laguna players
21st-century African-American people
20th-century African-American sportspeople